"Dumpweed" is a song by American rock band Blink-182. It is the opening track from their third studio album, Enema of the State (1999). A live version of the song was released as a promotional single in November 2000 supporting the band's live album The Mark, Tom and Travis Show (The Enema Strikes Back). The song explores frustration in relationships.

Background
Though credited to both guitarist Tom DeLonge and bassist Mark Hoppus, the song was written and sung by DeLonge. The song originated as a collection of unrelated guitar riffs, which he considered "catchy and intricate but simple", bridged with what he felt was a "very nursery rhyme" riff to augment the verse. The song opens Enema of the State; DeLonge, in the 2016 documentary The Pursuit of Tone, felt it was a good indication of the direction the band was heading in, and called it "probably the best opener we've ever had."

"Dumpweed" explores frustration with women. Gavin Edwards of Rolling Stone summarized the song as "about an ambivalent guy imagining the pain and the freedom of breaking up with his girlfriend, set to an unstoppable staccato rhythm." It has been described "callow complaint about girls not always doing exactly what you wish they would" by New York Nitsuh Abebe. The song is based around the hook "I need a girl that I can train," as in dog training. DeLonge explains the song in a 2000 tour booklet: "Girls are so much smarter than guys and can see the future as well as never forget the past. So that leaves the dog as the only thing men are smarter than." In an interview with MTV News the previous year, he clarified that the line did not refer to his girlfriend: "I got a lot of shit from her for that one."

The promo single prepends a masturbation joke from The Mark, Tom and Travis Show (The Enema Strikes Back) to the beginning of the track.

Reception
Michael Paoletta, in a review of the promotional live single in 2000 for Billboard, wrote that "stylistically, [the song] represents frantic, manic ska at its adolescent best." Chris Payne, reviewing the album fifteen years later in Billboard, felt the track "serves as scintillating sample of the bubblegum angst to come — yelped hooks, pogo riffs and drums from Travis Barker that go off like popcorn in the microwave." Kelefa Sanneh, writing for the New Yorker in 2016, describes it as a "downright giddy farewell to a "nightmare" girlfriend."

The song's central dog training metaphor has been the subject of criticism. "It's a nasty idea but the rest of the song makes it obvious he is the one at heel," wrote Ann Powers in her original review of the album for the New York Times.

Legacy
Four Year Strong performed a cover of the song for the tribute album A Tribute to Blink 182: Pacific Ridge Records Heroes of Pop Punk (2005). All Time Low frontman Alex Gaskarth included the song as part of a playlist of "songs that changed your life" for Alternative Press in 2009.

Ambient artist B.E.N covered the song on his Blink-182 tribute album Benema of the State.

Track listing
 "Dumpweed" (Live) – 2:50
 "Interview With Blink-182" (Hosted By Michael Halloran)
 "Interview With Blink-182" (Answers Only -- No Host)

References 

1999 songs
2000 singles
Blink-182 songs
Songs written by Mark Hoppus
Songs written by Tom DeLonge